Syed Zafarul Hasan (14 February 1885 – 19 June 1949) was a prominent twentieth-century Pakistani Muslim philosopher.

Biography

He was the eldest son of Khan Sahib Syed Diwan Mohammad.

Hasan was educated at Aligarh (M.A., LL. B.) and obtained doctorates from the universities of Erlangen and Heidelberg, Germany, and Oxford University. Dr Zafarul Hasan was the first Muslim Scholar of the Indian sub-continent to secure a PhD from Oxford in Philosophy. His doctoral thesis Realism is a classic on the subject. Prominent philosophers and educationists lauded his work, among them, his teacher Prof. John Alaxander Smith (1863–1930), and Allama Mohammad Iqbal.

He started teaching at the Aligarh Muslim University, Aligarh, India in 1911. In 1913, he became professor of philosophy at Islamia College, Peshawar. From 1924 to 1945 he was professor of philosophy at the Aligarh Muslim University, Aligarh  - where he  also served as Chairman of the Department of Philosophy and Dean of the Faculty of Arts. There, in 1939, he put forward the 'Aligarh Scheme' along with Dr Afzaal Hussain Qadri. They published a scheme ("The Problem of Indian Muslims") proposing three independent States.

From 1945 until the partition of the sub-continent, Dr Hasan was Emeritus Professor at Aligarh. In August 1947, he migrated to Lahore, Pakistan. He started work on a book that he could not complete due to his death in 1949. Only one volume ("PHILOSOPHY - A Critique") was ready, which was published from Lahore by Institute of Islamic Culture in 1988.

He received honours and served on a number of bodies: Member of Court, Member of Executive Council, Finance Co., Com. of Advanced Studies, Aligarh Muslim Univ.; Dir., Jamiat-ut-Tamaddunil-Islami, Bombay; Member, International Academy of Philosophy, Erlangen. Pres., Islami Jamaat, Aligarh. Member: Education Committee, All-India Muslim League; Kant Gesellscaft (Germany); Mind Assn. (England); Philosophical Congress (India); Academic Council of Muslim Univ. at Aligarh.

Works 
 Realism - An Attempt To Trace Its Origin And Development In Its Chief Representatives  (Cambridge University Press, London, 1928)
 Realism (translated into Urdu), 1927
 Monismus Spinozas, 1922
 Descartes' Dualism, 1912
 Philosophy and Education, 1927
 Philosophy and Its Advantages, 1931
 Realism is not Metaphysics, 1931
 Islamics, 1936
 The Problem, 1933
 Revelation and Apostle, 1937
 Message of Iqbal, 1938
 Philosophy of Religion
  Philosophy of Islam
 Philosophy of Kant
 PHILOSOPHY - A Critique (Institute of Islamic Culture, Lahore, 1988)

Sources
 World Biography, Fourth Edition of the Biographical Encyclopedia of the World, Institute for Research in Biography, New York, page 2183.

Islamic philosophers
Pakistani philosophers
1885 births
1949 deaths
20th-century Pakistani writers
Academic staff of Aligarh Muslim University
Academic staff of Islamia College University
Metaphysicians
Philosophers of religion
Members of the Pakistan Philosophical Congress
20th-century Pakistani philosophers
Aligarh Muslim University alumni